Andrei Leonidovich Lamov (born 9 March 1986) is a Russian ski-orienteering competitor and world champion. He is a six-time World Champion.

He placed third in the overall World Cup in Ski Orienteering in 2007–18.

References

External links
 

Russian orienteers
Male orienteers
Ski-orienteers
1986 births
Living people
People from Cherepovets
Sportspeople from Vologda Oblast
21st-century Russian people